Ippokrateio General Hospital of Thessaloniki is a public hospital in Thessaloniki, Greece.

The main building was constructed in 1908 as "Hirsch Hospital" funded by Maurice de Hirsch (architect Pietro Arrigoni).

During the Axis occupation of Greece it was used by the German army. It was renamed after World War II. Today it is part of the National Health System and is the largest hospital in Thessaloniki.

References

Sources
Ιπποκράτειο Νοσοκομείο
ippokratio.gr

Hospitals in Thessaloniki
1908 establishments in the Ottoman Empire